This is a partial list of unnumbered minor planets for principal provisional designations assigned during 16–30 September 2004. , a total of 203 bodies remain unnumbered for this period. Objects for this year are listed on the following pages: A–B · C · D–E · F · G–H · J–O · P–Q · Ri · Rii · Riii · S · Ti · Tii · Tiii · Tiv · U–V · W–X and Y. Also see previous and next year.

S 

|- id="2004 SA" bgcolor=#FFC2E0
| 7 || 2004 SA || AMO || 26.1 || data-sort-value="0.021" | 21 m || single || 1 day || 17 Sep 2004 || 32 || align=left | Disc.: Spacewatch || 
|- id="2004 SD" bgcolor=#FA8072
| 2 || 2004 SD || MCA || 18.4 || data-sort-value="0.62" | 620 m || multiple || 2004–2020 || 21 May 2020 || 85 || align=left | Disc.: LINEARAlt.: 2012 KF6 || 
|- id="2004 SL" bgcolor=#FA8072
| – || 2004 SL || MCA || 17.5 || data-sort-value="0.94" | 940 m || single || 23 days || 08 Oct 2004 || 29 || align=left | Disc.: LINEAR || 
|- id="2004 SQ" bgcolor=#E9E9E9
| 1 || 2004 SQ || MBA-M || 17.4 || 1.8 km || multiple || 2004–2019 || 04 Jan 2019 || 113 || align=left | Disc.: LINEARAlt.: 2018 RL8 || 
|- id="2004 SR" bgcolor=#FFC2E0
| 6 || 2004 SR || APO || 23.8 || data-sort-value="0.062" | 62 m || single || 18 days || 01 Oct 2004 || 73 || align=left | Disc.: LINEAR || 
|- id="2004 SS" bgcolor=#FFC2E0
| 0 || 2004 SS || AMO || 21.9 || data-sort-value="0.15" | 150 m || multiple || 2004–2017 || 22 Nov 2017 || 293 || align=left | Disc.: LINEARPotentially hazardous object || 
|- id="2004 SV" bgcolor=#d6d6d6
| 0 || 2004 SV || MBA-O || 16.40 || 2.9 km || multiple || 2004–2021 || 07 Dec 2021 || 197 || align=left | Disc.: LINEARAlt.: 2010 VQ20 || 
|- id="2004 SW" bgcolor=#E9E9E9
| 0 || 2004 SW || MBA-M || 17.47 || 1.3 km || multiple || 2004–2022 || 03 Jan 2022 || 73 || align=left | Disc.: LINEAR || 
|- id="2004 SY" bgcolor=#E9E9E9
| – || 2004 SY || MBA-M || 17.2 || 1.1 km || single || 42 days || 21 Oct 2004 || 37 || align=left | Disc.: LINEAR || 
|- id="2004 SA1" bgcolor=#FFC2E0
| 6 ||  || APO || 25.3 || data-sort-value="0.031" | 31 m || single || 6 days || 22 Sep 2004 || 33 || align=left | Disc.: LINEARAMO at MPC || 
|- id="2004 SB1" bgcolor=#FFC2E0
| 2 ||  || APO || 20.4 || data-sort-value="0.30" | 300 m || multiple || 1995–2018 || 05 Aug 2018 || 246 || align=left | Disc.: LINEAR || 
|- id="2004 SH1" bgcolor=#E9E9E9
| 0 ||  || MBA-M || 17.60 || 1.3 km || multiple || 2004–2021 || 09 Jun 2021 || 98 || align=left | Disc.: LINEAR || 
|- id="2004 SF2" bgcolor=#fefefe
| 0 ||  || MBA-I || 18.5 || data-sort-value="0.59" | 590 m || multiple || 2001–2020 || 20 Oct 2020 || 108 || align=left | Disc.: SpacewatchAlt.: 2016 GY79 || 
|- id="2004 SJ2" bgcolor=#E9E9E9
| 3 ||  || MBA-M || 18.0 || 1.1 km || multiple || 2004–2013 || 09 Nov 2013 || 29 || align=left | Disc.: Spacewatch || 
|- id="2004 ST2" bgcolor=#FFC2E0
| 4 ||  || ATE || 24.2 || data-sort-value="0.051" | 51 m || multiple || 2004–2018 || 23 Sep 2018 || 64 || align=left | Disc.: LINEAR || 
|- id="2004 SW2" bgcolor=#fefefe
| 1 ||  || MBA-I || 18.1 || data-sort-value="0.71" | 710 m || multiple || 2004–2019 || 05 Jan 2019 || 143 || align=left | Disc.: Berg. Gladbach || 
|- id="2004 SX2" bgcolor=#d6d6d6
| 0 ||  || MBA-O || 16.07 || 3.4 km || multiple || 2004–2021 || 29 Nov 2021 || 281 || align=left | Disc.: Berg. Gladbach || 
|- id="2004 SZ2" bgcolor=#fefefe
| 1 ||  || HUN || 17.9 || data-sort-value="0.78" | 780 m || multiple || 2004–2019 || 01 Apr 2019 || 109 || align=left | Disc.: Piszkéstető Stn.Alt.: 2011 ES44 || 
|- id="2004 SE4" bgcolor=#fefefe
| 0 ||  || MBA-I || 18.65 || data-sort-value="0.55" | 550 m || multiple || 1997–2021 || 06 Apr 2021 || 32 || align=left | Disc.: Spacewatch || 
|- id="2004 SM4" bgcolor=#E9E9E9
| 1 ||  || MBA-M || 18.50 || data-sort-value="0.59" | 590 m || multiple || 2004–2021 || 09 Dec 2021 || 35 || align=left | Disc.: SpacewatchAdded on 24 December 2021 || 
|- id="2004 SX4" bgcolor=#fefefe
| 0 ||  || HUN || 17.4 || data-sort-value="0.98" | 980 m || multiple || 2003–2021 || 04 Jan 2021 || 175 || align=left | Disc.: SSSAlt.: 2011 EA51 || 
|- id="2004 SY4" bgcolor=#FFC2E0
| 6 ||  || APO || 24.4 || data-sort-value="0.047" | 47 m || single || 15 days || 05 Oct 2004 || 51 || align=left | Disc.: SSSAMO at MPC || 
|- id="2004 SK5" bgcolor=#fefefe
| 0 ||  || MBA-I || 18.61 || data-sort-value="0.56" | 560 m || multiple || 2004–2021 || 14 Apr 2021 || 58 || align=left | Disc.: Spacewatch || 
|- id="2004 SL5" bgcolor=#E9E9E9
| 0 ||  || MBA-M || 17.94 || data-sort-value="0.77" | 770 m || multiple || 2004–2021 || 24 Nov 2021 || 83 || align=left | Disc.: SpacewatchAlt.: 2020 HS24 || 
|- id="2004 SQ5" bgcolor=#fefefe
| 1 ||  || MBA-I || 19.0 || data-sort-value="0.47" | 470 m || multiple || 2004–2020 || 24 Jun 2020 || 80 || align=left | Disc.: SpacewatchAlt.: 2017 OE21 || 
|- id="2004 SX5" bgcolor=#fefefe
| 3 ||  || MBA-I || 18.8 || data-sort-value="0.52" | 520 m || multiple || 2004–2016 || 02 Jan 2016 || 30 || align=left | Disc.: Spacewatch || 
|- id="2004 SB6" bgcolor=#fefefe
| 0 ||  || MBA-I || 18.6 || data-sort-value="0.57" | 570 m || multiple || 1998–2020 || 15 Dec 2020 || 62 || align=left | Disc.: SpacewatchAdded on 9 March 2021Alt.: 2015 AX51 || 
|- id="2004 SM6" bgcolor=#d6d6d6
| 0 ||  || MBA-O || 17.5 || 1.8 km || multiple || 2004–2020 || 19 Oct 2020 || 107 || align=left | Disc.: Spacewatch || 
|- id="2004 SV6" bgcolor=#E9E9E9
| 0 ||  || MBA-M || 17.80 || 1.2 km || multiple || 2004–2021 || 27 Nov 2021 || 65 || align=left | Disc.: SpacewatchAdded on 30 September 2021 || 
|- id="2004 SW6" bgcolor=#fefefe
| 0 ||  || MBA-I || 17.9 || data-sort-value="0.78" | 780 m || multiple || 2004–2020 || 22 Mar 2020 || 63 || align=left | Disc.: SpacewatchAdded on 22 July 2020 || 
|- id="2004 SY6" bgcolor=#fefefe
| 0 ||  || MBA-I || 18.3 || data-sort-value="0.65" | 650 m || multiple || 2004–2019 || 03 Oct 2019 || 49 || align=left | Disc.: SpacewatchAlt.: 2015 QC1 || 
|- id="2004 SA7" bgcolor=#fefefe
| 3 ||  || MBA-I || 19.0 || data-sort-value="0.47" | 470 m || multiple || 2004–2019 || 19 Nov 2019 || 30 || align=left | Disc.: Spacewatch || 
|- id="2004 SK7" bgcolor=#E9E9E9
| 1 ||  || MBA-M || 18.34 || data-sort-value="0.90" | 900 m || multiple || 2004–2021 || 27 Oct 2021 || 70 || align=left | Disc.: SpacewatchAdded on 22 July 2020 || 
|- id="2004 ST7" bgcolor=#fefefe
| 0 ||  || MBA-I || 17.8 || data-sort-value="0.82" | 820 m || multiple || 2004–2020 || 16 Dec 2020 || 56 || align=left | Disc.: SpacewatchAlt.: 2008 UQ25 || 
|- id="2004 SZ7" bgcolor=#d6d6d6
| 0 ||  || MBA-O || 16.84 || 2.4 km || multiple || 2004–2021 || 25 Nov 2021 || 123 || align=left | Disc.: SpacewatchAlt.: 2015 PN298 || 
|- id="2004 SD8" bgcolor=#fefefe
| – ||  || MBA-I || 19.8 || data-sort-value="0.33" | 330 m || single || 10 days || 21 Sep 2004 || 9 || align=left | Disc.: Spacewatch || 
|- id="2004 SE8" bgcolor=#fefefe
| 1 ||  || MBA-I || 17.5 || data-sort-value="0.94" | 940 m || multiple || 2003–2021 || 08 Jan 2021 || 76 || align=left | Disc.: Spacewatch || 
|- id="2004 SU8" bgcolor=#fefefe
| 3 ||  || MBA-I || 18.6 || data-sort-value="0.57" | 570 m || multiple || 2004–2020 || 23 Jan 2020 || 23 || align=left | Disc.: LINEAR || 
|- id="2004 SZ8" bgcolor=#E9E9E9
| 1 ||  || MBA-M || 17.5 || 1.3 km || multiple || 2004–2019 || 04 Apr 2019 || 81 || align=left | Disc.: LINEARAlt.: 2017 SR112 || 
|- id="2004 SA9" bgcolor=#fefefe
| 0 ||  || MBA-I || 19.33 || data-sort-value="0.40" | 400 m || multiple || 2004–2021 || 07 Nov 2021 || 78 || align=left | Disc.: LINEAR || 
|- id="2004 SO9" bgcolor=#fefefe
| 1 ||  || MBA-I || 17.7 || data-sort-value="0.86" | 860 m || multiple || 2004–2020 || 17 Feb 2020 || 118 || align=left | Disc.: LINEARAlt.: 2015 PC294 || 
|- id="2004 SV10" bgcolor=#E9E9E9
| 0 ||  || MBA-M || 17.73 || 1.2 km || multiple || 2004–2021 || 07 Aug 2021 || 166 || align=left | Disc.: SSSAlt.: 2017 SX34 || 
|- id="2004 SA11" bgcolor=#E9E9E9
| 0 ||  || MBA-M || 16.6 || 2.7 km || multiple || 2004–2021 || 09 Jun 2021 || 102 || align=left | Disc.: SSSAlt.: 2009 XD26 || 
|- id="2004 SK12" bgcolor=#fefefe
| 0 ||  || MBA-I || 16.4 || 1.6 km || multiple || 2004–2021 || 11 Jun 2021 || 212 || align=left | Disc.: SSS || 
|- id="2004 SV12" bgcolor=#fefefe
| 0 ||  || MBA-I || 17.89 || data-sort-value="0.79" | 790 m || multiple || 2004–2021 || 12 May 2021 || 82 || align=left | Disc.: LONEOSAlt.: 2008 WN54 || 
|- id="2004 SN13" bgcolor=#E9E9E9
| – ||  || MBA-M || 17.4 || data-sort-value="0.98" | 980 m || single || 27 days || 11 Oct 2004 || 14 || align=left | Disc.: LINEAR || 
|- id="2004 SW14" bgcolor=#fefefe
| 0 ||  || MBA-I || 18.1 || data-sort-value="0.71" | 710 m || multiple || 2001–2020 || 10 Dec 2020 || 132 || align=left | Disc.: LONEOS || 
|- id="2004 SN15" bgcolor=#d6d6d6
| 0 ||  || MBA-O || 16.84 || 2.4 km || multiple || 1993–2021 || 28 Nov 2021 || 110 || align=left | Disc.: LONEOSAdded on 5 November 2021Alt.: 2015 PR209 || 
|- id="2004 SM16" bgcolor=#fefefe
| 0 ||  || MBA-I || 17.8 || data-sort-value="0.82" | 820 m || multiple || 2004–2019 || 20 Dec 2019 || 82 || align=left | Disc.: LONEOS || 
|- id="2004 SJ17" bgcolor=#fefefe
| 1 ||  || MBA-I || 17.8 || data-sort-value="0.82" | 820 m || multiple || 2004–2019 || 22 Jun 2019 || 57 || align=left | Disc.: LONEOSAlt.: 2008 TS68 || 
|- id="2004 SE19" bgcolor=#fefefe
| 3 ||  || MBA-I || 18.7 || data-sort-value="0.54" | 540 m || multiple || 2004–2019 || 29 Oct 2019 || 42 || align=left | Disc.: LINEAR || 
|- id="2004 SA20" bgcolor=#FFC2E0
| 8 ||  || APO || 22.8 || data-sort-value="0.098" | 98 m || single || 17 days || 08 Oct 2004 || 19 || align=left | Disc.: LINEAR || 
|- id="2004 SC20" bgcolor=#fefefe
| 1 ||  || MBA-I || 18.2 || data-sort-value="0.68" | 680 m || multiple || 2004–2019 || 04 Oct 2019 || 65 || align=left | Disc.: Astronomical Research Obs.Alt.: 2008 UB269 || 
|- id="2004 SA22" bgcolor=#E9E9E9
| 2 ||  || MBA-M || 17.7 || data-sort-value="0.86" | 860 m || multiple || 2000–2016 || 07 Aug 2016 || 32 || align=left | Disc.: SpacewatchAdded on 21 August 2021 || 
|- id="2004 SH23" bgcolor=#fefefe
| 0 ||  || MBA-I || 18.3 || data-sort-value="0.65" | 650 m || multiple || 2004–2020 || 25 Jan 2020 || 65 || align=left | Disc.: Spacewatch || 
|- id="2004 SJ23" bgcolor=#d6d6d6
| 0 ||  || MBA-O || 16.8 || 2.4 km || multiple || 2004–2021 || 11 Jan 2021 || 123 || align=left | Disc.: Spacewatch || 
|- id="2004 SU23" bgcolor=#E9E9E9
| 0 ||  || MBA-M || 18.27 || data-sort-value="0.66" | 660 m || multiple || 2004–2021 || 08 Dec 2021 || 34 || align=left | Disc.: Spacewatch || 
|- id="2004 SA24" bgcolor=#fefefe
| 0 ||  || MBA-I || 18.6 || data-sort-value="0.57" | 570 m || multiple || 2004–2020 || 17 Nov 2020 || 89 || align=left | Disc.: SpacewatchAlt.: 2015 BE41 || 
|- id="2004 SM24" bgcolor=#d6d6d6
| 1 ||  || MBA-O || 17.11 || 2.1 km || multiple || 2004–2021 || 25 Nov 2021 || 64 || align=left | Disc.: SpacewatchAlt.: 2021 QC33 || 
|- id="2004 SW24" bgcolor=#fefefe
| 0 ||  || MBA-I || 19.00 || data-sort-value="0.47" | 470 m || multiple || 2004–2021 || 02 Oct 2021 || 54 || align=left | Disc.: LPL/Spacewatch IIAlt.: 2011 UU378 || 
|- id="2004 SX24" bgcolor=#fefefe
| 0 ||  || MBA-I || 18.2 || data-sort-value="0.68" | 680 m || multiple || 2000–2020 || 21 Jan 2020 || 77 || align=left | Disc.: LPL/Spacewatch II || 
|- id="2004 SY24" bgcolor=#E9E9E9
| 0 ||  || MBA-M || 17.80 || 1.2 km || multiple || 2004–2021 || 09 Nov 2021 || 103 || align=left | Disc.: LPL/Spacewatch IIAlt.: 2015 FW266 || 
|- id="2004 SB25" bgcolor=#d6d6d6
| 0 ||  || MBA-O || 16.65 || 2.6 km || multiple || 2004–2021 || 08 Nov 2021 || 98 || align=left | Disc.: LPL/Spacewatch IIAlt.: 2008 GY170, 2015 PO282 || 
|- id="2004 SD26" bgcolor=#FFC2E0
| 3 ||  || APO || 18.7 || data-sort-value="0.65" | 650 m || multiple || 2004–2007 || 20 Sep 2007 || 66 || align=left | Disc.: LINEAR || 
|- id="2004 SE26" bgcolor=#FFC2E0
| 8 ||  || APO || 25.8 || data-sort-value="0.025" | 25 m || single || 2 days || 23 Sep 2004 || 18 || align=left | Disc.: LINEAR || 
|- id="2004 SQ26" bgcolor=#fefefe
| 1 ||  || HUN || 19.3 || data-sort-value="0.41" | 410 m || multiple || 2004–2021 || 15 Jan 2021 || 38 || align=left | Disc.: Spacewatch || 
|- id="2004 SR26" bgcolor=#FFC2E0
| 6 ||  || APO || 26.6 || data-sort-value="0.017" | 17 m || single || 2 days || 24 Sep 2004 || 26 || align=left | Disc.: LINEARAMO at MPC || 
|- id="2004 SS26" bgcolor=#FFC2E0
| 6 ||  || APO || 23.1 || data-sort-value="0.085" | 85 m || single || 2 days || 24 Sep 2004 || 32 || align=left | Disc.: LINEAR || 
|- id="2004 ST26" bgcolor=#FFC2E0
| 7 ||  || APO || 26.3 || data-sort-value="0.020" | 20 m || single || 1 day || 24 Sep 2004 || 25 || align=left | Disc.: Spacewatch || 
|- id="2004 SU26" bgcolor=#FFC2E0
| 9 ||  || APO || 24.9 || data-sort-value="0.037" | 37 m || single || 1 day || 24 Sep 2004 || 11 || align=left | Disc.: LINEAR || 
|- id="2004 SW26" bgcolor=#FFC2E0
| 9 ||  || ATE || 25.7 || data-sort-value="0.026" | 26 m || single || 1 day || 24 Sep 2004 || 24 || align=left | Disc.: LPL/Spacewatch II || 
|- id="2004 SG27" bgcolor=#fefefe
| 0 ||  || MBA-I || 18.4 || data-sort-value="0.62" | 620 m || multiple || 2004–2019 || 28 Oct 2019 || 73 || align=left | Disc.: SpacewatchAlt.: 2015 TV4 || 
|- id="2004 SH27" bgcolor=#fefefe
| 0 ||  || MBA-I || 18.0 || data-sort-value="0.75" | 750 m || multiple || 2004–2019 || 01 Nov 2019 || 97 || align=left | Disc.: SpacewatchAlt.: 2007 JQ36, 2019 SB56 || 
|- id="2004 SV27" bgcolor=#d6d6d6
| 1 ||  || MBA-O || 17.0 || 2.2 km || multiple || 2004–2021 || 10 Oct 2021 || 45 || align=left | Disc.: SpacewatchAdded on 30 September 2021Alt.: 2010 OM35 || 
|- id="2004 SG28" bgcolor=#E9E9E9
| 0 ||  || MBA-M || 17.50 || 1.3 km || multiple || 2004–2021 || 31 Oct 2021 || 106 || align=left | Disc.: Spacewatch || 
|- id="2004 SZ29" bgcolor=#E9E9E9
| 0 ||  || MBA-M || 17.4 || 1.8 km || multiple || 2004–2021 || 13 Jun 2021 || 136 || align=left | Disc.: LINEARAlt.: 2013 SO8 || 
|- id="2004 SS33" bgcolor=#E9E9E9
| 0 ||  || MBA-M || 17.34 || 1.4 km || multiple || 2004–2022 || 22 Jan 2022 || 154 || align=left | Disc.: LINEAR || 
|- id="2004 SD34" bgcolor=#E9E9E9
| 0 ||  || MBA-M || 18.23 || data-sort-value="0.95" | 950 m || multiple || 2004–2021 || 08 Nov 2021 || 60 || align=left | Disc.: Spacewatch || 
|- id="2004 SK34" bgcolor=#d6d6d6
| 1 ||  || MBA-O || 17.9 || 1.5 km || multiple || 2004–2018 || 11 Aug 2018 || 31 || align=left | Disc.: Spacewatch || 
|- id="2004 SL34" bgcolor=#E9E9E9
| 1 ||  || MBA-M || 18.0 || data-sort-value="0.75" | 750 m || multiple || 2004–2020 || 07 Oct 2020 || 102 || align=left | Disc.: SpacewatchAlt.: 2008 RL49 || 
|- id="2004 SM34" bgcolor=#d6d6d6
| 1 ||  || MBA-O || 17.23 || 2.0 km || multiple || 2004–2021 || 04 Oct 2021 || 48 || align=left | Disc.: Spacewatch || 
|- id="2004 SP34" bgcolor=#E9E9E9
| 2 ||  || MBA-M || 18.0 || 1.1 km || multiple || 2004–2017 || 17 Sep 2017 || 21 || align=left | Disc.: Spacewatch || 
|- id="2004 SQ34" bgcolor=#d6d6d6
| 0 ||  || MBA-O || 16.93 || 2.3 km || multiple || 2004–2021 || 28 Nov 2021 || 91 || align=left | Disc.: Spacewatch || 
|- id="2004 SR34" bgcolor=#E9E9E9
| 0 ||  || MBA-M || 18.23 || data-sort-value="0.95" | 950 m || multiple || 2004–2021 || 11 Oct 2021 || 87 || align=left | Disc.: Spacewatch || 
|- id="2004 SY34" bgcolor=#E9E9E9
| 0 ||  || MBA-M || 17.86 || 1.1 km || multiple || 2004–2021 || 01 Nov 2021 || 126 || align=left | Disc.: LINEAR || 
|- id="2004 SL35" bgcolor=#E9E9E9
| 0 ||  || MBA-M || 17.4 || 1.4 km || multiple || 2004–2017 || 12 Aug 2017 || 30 || align=left | Disc.: Spacewatch || 
|- id="2004 SM35" bgcolor=#fefefe
| 0 ||  || MBA-I || 18.4 || data-sort-value="0.62" | 620 m || multiple || 2004–2020 || 26 Jan 2020 || 55 || align=left | Disc.: Spacewatch || 
|- id="2004 SN35" bgcolor=#d6d6d6
| 0 ||  || MBA-O || 17.14 || 2.1 km || multiple || 2004–2022 || 25 Jan 2022 || 66 || align=left | Disc.: SpacewatchAdded on 17 January 2021 || 
|- id="2004 SS35" bgcolor=#E9E9E9
| 1 ||  || MBA-M || 18.6 || data-sort-value="0.80" | 800 m || multiple || 2004–2017 || 12 Aug 2017 || 20 || align=left | Disc.: Spacewatch || 
|- id="2004 ST35" bgcolor=#E9E9E9
| 0 ||  || MBA-M || 17.72 || 1.2 km || multiple || 2004–2021 || 07 Nov 2021 || 103 || align=left | Disc.: SpacewatchAlt.: 2017 VR20 || 
|- id="2004 SX35" bgcolor=#d6d6d6
| 0 ||  || MBA-O || 17.0 || 2.2 km || multiple || 1999–2020 || 17 Oct 2020 || 80 || align=left | Disc.: SpacewatchAlt.: 2015 VL56 || 
|- id="2004 SY35" bgcolor=#E9E9E9
| 0 ||  || MBA-M || 17.93 || 1.1 km || multiple || 2004–2021 || 08 Jul 2021 || 38 || align=left | Disc.: Spacewatch || 
|- id="2004 SB36" bgcolor=#d6d6d6
| 0 ||  || MBA-O || 16.69 || 2.6 km || multiple || 2004–2021 || 26 Oct 2021 || 88 || align=left | Disc.: Spacewatch || 
|- id="2004 SC36" bgcolor=#E9E9E9
| 0 ||  || MBA-M || 16.9 || 2.3 km || multiple || 2004–2021 || 15 Jun 2021 || 107 || align=left | Disc.: Spacewatch || 
|- id="2004 SQ36" bgcolor=#fefefe
| 0 ||  || MBA-I || 18.73 || data-sort-value="0.53" | 530 m || multiple || 2004–2021 || 09 May 2021 || 63 || align=left | Disc.: Spacewatch || 
|- id="2004 SA37" bgcolor=#d6d6d6
| 0 ||  || MBA-O || 17.45 || 1.8 km || multiple || 2004–2021 || 08 Nov 2021 || 71 || align=left | Disc.: SpacewatchAdded on 21 August 2021Alt.: 2010 PM42 || 
|- id="2004 SB37" bgcolor=#fefefe
| 0 ||  || MBA-I || 18.2 || data-sort-value="0.68" | 680 m || multiple || 2004–2019 || 19 Nov 2019 || 31 || align=left | Disc.: Spacewatch || 
|- id="2004 SO37" bgcolor=#d6d6d6
| 0 ||  || MBA-O || 17.72 || 1.6 km || multiple || 2004–2021 || 28 Nov 2021 || 54 || align=left | Disc.: Spacewatch || 
|- id="2004 SU37" bgcolor=#E9E9E9
| 0 ||  || MBA-M || 17.9 || 1.1 km || multiple || 2004–2019 || 08 Jan 2019 || 37 || align=left | Disc.: Spacewatch || 
|- id="2004 SB38" bgcolor=#E9E9E9
| 0 ||  || MBA-M || 17.7 || 1.2 km || multiple || 2004–2018 || 12 Dec 2018 || 44 || align=left | Disc.: Spacewatch || 
|- id="2004 SG38" bgcolor=#E9E9E9
| 0 ||  || MBA-M || 17.6 || 1.3 km || multiple || 2004–2018 || 30 Dec 2018 || 37 || align=left | Disc.: SpacewatchAlt.: 2015 AO151 || 
|- id="2004 SH38" bgcolor=#fefefe
| 0 ||  || MBA-I || 19.46 || data-sort-value="0.38" | 380 m || multiple || 2004–2021 || 26 Oct 2021 || 79 || align=left | Disc.: SpacewatchAlt.: 2011 UY138 || 
|- id="2004 SX42" bgcolor=#E9E9E9
| 0 ||  || MBA-M || 17.79 || 1.2 km || multiple || 2004–2021 || 07 Nov 2021 || 122 || align=left | Disc.: LINEARAlt.: 2017 VG27 || 
|- id="2004 SB43" bgcolor=#E9E9E9
| 0 ||  || MBA-M || 17.2 || 2.0 km || multiple || 2004–2020 || 19 Jan 2020 || 35 || align=left | Disc.: LINEAR || 
|- id="2004 SR43" bgcolor=#fefefe
| 0 ||  || MBA-I || 18.93 || data-sort-value="0.49" | 490 m || multiple || 2004–2021 || 30 Nov 2021 || 66 || align=left | Disc.: LINEARAlt.: 2014 QR440 || 
|- id="2004 SS43" bgcolor=#fefefe
| 0 ||  || MBA-I || 17.9 || data-sort-value="0.78" | 780 m || multiple || 2004–2019 || 25 Nov 2019 || 84 || align=left | Disc.: LINEAR || 
|- id="2004 SF44" bgcolor=#E9E9E9
| – ||  || MBA-M || 17.4 || 1.4 km || single || 22 days || 10 Oct 2004 || 16 || align=left | Disc.: LINEAR || 
|- id="2004 SL44" bgcolor=#E9E9E9
| 0 ||  || MBA-M || 17.38 || 1.9 km || multiple || 2004–2021 || 05 Jun 2021 || 112 || align=left | Disc.: LINEARAlt.: 2013 RX42 || 
|- id="2004 SW44" bgcolor=#E9E9E9
| 3 ||  || MBA-M || 18.7 || data-sort-value="0.76" | 760 m || multiple || 2004–2021 || 08 Dec 2021 || 47 || align=left | Disc.: LINEAR || 
|- id="2004 SC47" bgcolor=#fefefe
| 1 ||  || MBA-I || 18.2 || data-sort-value="0.68" | 680 m || multiple || 2004–2019 || 20 Dec 2019 || 126 || align=left | Disc.: LINEARAlt.: 2015 RX95 || 
|- id="2004 SU50" bgcolor=#E9E9E9
| 3 ||  || MBA-M || 18.3 || 1.2 km || multiple || 2004–2013 || 22 Oct 2013 || 23 || align=left | Disc.: LPL/Spacewatch II || 
|- id="2004 SW50" bgcolor=#E9E9E9
| 2 ||  || MBA-M || 18.89 || data-sort-value="0.70" | 700 m || multiple || 2004–2021 || 27 Oct 2021 || 34 || align=left | Disc.: LPL/Spacewatch IIAdded on 5 November 2021Alt.: 2021 RT70 || 
|- id="2004 SY50" bgcolor=#E9E9E9
| 0 ||  || MBA-M || 17.18 || 2.0 km || multiple || 2004–2021 || 15 Apr 2021 || 69 || align=left | Disc.: LPL/Spacewatch IIAlt.: 2009 WG205 || 
|- id="2004 SE51" bgcolor=#d6d6d6
| 0 ||  || MBA-O || 18.07 || 1.4 km || multiple || 2004–2021 || 27 Nov 2021 || 66 || align=left | Disc.: LPL/Spacewatch IIAdded on 5 November 2021 || 
|- id="2004 SL55" bgcolor=#d6d6d6
| 0 ||  || MBA-O || 17.87 || 1.5 km || multiple || 2004–2021 || 09 Dec 2021 || 82 || align=left | Disc.: SpacewatchAdded on 30 September 2021 || 
|- id="2004 SU55" bgcolor=#FFC2E0
| 5 ||  || AMO || 24.7 || data-sort-value="0.041" | 41 m || single || 81 days || 12 Dec 2004 || 40 || align=left | Disc.: LINEAR || 
|- id="2004 SC56" bgcolor=#FFC2E0
| 3 ||  || ATE || 22.7 || data-sort-value="0.291" | 291 m || multiple || 2004–2010 || 01 Sep 2010 || 161 || align=left | Disc.: LINEAR || 
|- id="2004 SJ56" bgcolor=#E9E9E9
| 1 ||  || MBA-M || 18.29 || data-sort-value="0.92" | 920 m || multiple || 2004–2021 || 01 Nov 2021 || 48 || align=left | Disc.: LONEOSAdded on 5 November 2021Alt.: 2021 PG107 || 
|- id="2004 SN56" bgcolor=#fefefe
| 0 ||  || MBA-I || 18.3 || data-sort-value="0.65" | 650 m || multiple || 2004–2018 || 16 Jul 2018 || 51 || align=left | Disc.: LONEOS || 
|- id="2004 SK57" bgcolor=#E9E9E9
| 0 ||  || MBA-M || 17.22 || 1.5 km || multiple || 2002–2021 || 04 Oct 2021 || 101 || align=left | Disc.: LONEOSAdded on 22 July 2020 || 
|- id="2004 SC60" bgcolor=#C2E0FF
| 1 ||  || TNO || 7.2 || 131 km || multiple || 2004–2021 || 30 Sep 2021 || 135 || align=left | Disc.: Palomar Obs.LoUTNOs, res4:7 || 
|- id="2004 SG61" bgcolor=#fefefe
| 3 ||  || MBA-I || 18.6 || data-sort-value="0.57" | 570 m || multiple || 2004–2016 || 04 Jan 2016 || 37 || align=left | Disc.: LINEARAlt.: 2015 VP114 || 
|- id="2004 SY61" bgcolor=#E9E9E9
| 0 ||  || MBA-M || 17.67 || 1.2 km || multiple || 2004–2019 || 12 Jan 2019 || 52 || align=left | Disc.: Spacewatch || 
|- id="2004 SZ61" bgcolor=#E9E9E9
| 0 ||  || MBA-M || 18.05 || 1.0 km || multiple || 2004–2021 || 30 Jul 2021 || 48 || align=left | Disc.: LPL/Spacewatch IIAlt.: 2015 BU194 || 
|- id="2004 SE62" bgcolor=#E9E9E9
| 1 ||  || MBA-M || 17.6 || 1.7 km || multiple || 2004–2016 || 03 Apr 2016 || 26 || align=left | Disc.: Spacewatch || 
|- id="2004 SF62" bgcolor=#E9E9E9
| 0 ||  || MBA-M || 18.06 || data-sort-value="0.73" | 730 m || multiple || 2002–2022 || 07 Jan 2022 || 26 || align=left | Disc.: Spacewatch || 
|- id="2004 SK62" bgcolor=#d6d6d6
| 0 ||  || MBA-O || 17.2 || 2.0 km || multiple || 2004–2018 || 05 Oct 2018 || 57 || align=left | Disc.: Spacewatch || 
|- id="2004 SO62" bgcolor=#d6d6d6
| 2 ||  || MBA-O || 17.9 || 1.5 km || multiple || 1999–2019 || 29 Oct 2019 || 32 || align=left | Disc.: Mauna Kea Obs.Added on 17 January 2021Alt.: 2004 RW350, 2009 SS306 || 
|- id="2004 SQ62" bgcolor=#E9E9E9
| 0 ||  || MBA-M || 17.26 || 1.5 km || multiple || 2004–2021 || 23 Oct 2021 || 114 || align=left | Disc.: LONEOS || 
|- id="2004 SR62" bgcolor=#fefefe
| 1 ||  || MBA-I || 18.1 || data-sort-value="0.71" | 710 m || multiple || 2004–2019 || 28 Nov 2019 || 94 || align=left | Disc.: LPL/Spacewatch II || 
|- id="2004 SU62" bgcolor=#E9E9E9
| 0 ||  || MBA-M || 17.89 || 1.1 km || multiple || 2003–2021 || 03 Oct 2021 || 81 || align=left | Disc.: LPL/Spacewatch II || 
|- id="2004 SV62" bgcolor=#E9E9E9
| 0 ||  || MBA-M || 17.82 || 1.1 km || multiple || 2004–2021 || 06 Oct 2021 || 75 || align=left | Disc.: Spacewatch || 
|- id="2004 SX62" bgcolor=#E9E9E9
| 0 ||  || MBA-M || 17.65 || 1.2 km || multiple || 2004–2021 || 29 Oct 2021 || 118 || align=left | Disc.: LPL/Spacewatch II || 
|- id="2004 SY62" bgcolor=#E9E9E9
| 0 ||  || MBA-M || 17.22 || 2.0 km || multiple || 2004–2021 || 09 Apr 2021 || 74 || align=left | Disc.: Spacewatch || 
|- id="2004 SB63" bgcolor=#E9E9E9
| 0 ||  || MBA-M || 17.94 || 1.1 km || multiple || 2004–2021 || 06 Nov 2021 || 70 || align=left | Disc.: Spacewatch || 
|- id="2004 SE63" bgcolor=#d6d6d6
| 0 ||  || MBA-O || 17.04 || 2.2 km || multiple || 2002–2021 || 06 Nov 2021 || 57 || align=left | Disc.: Spacewatch || 
|- id="2004 SF63" bgcolor=#E9E9E9
| 1 ||  || MBA-M || 17.8 || data-sort-value="0.82" | 820 m || multiple || 1992–2020 || 11 Oct 2020 || 105 || align=left | Disc.: Spacewatch || 
|- id="2004 SG63" bgcolor=#E9E9E9
| 0 ||  || MBA-M || 17.91 || 1.1 km || multiple || 2004–2021 || 27 Nov 2021 || 123 || align=left | Disc.: Spacewatch || 
|- id="2004 SH63" bgcolor=#E9E9E9
| 1 ||  || MBA-M || 17.5 || 1.3 km || multiple || 2004–2017 || 10 Oct 2017 || 43 || align=left | Disc.: Spacewatch || 
|- id="2004 SJ63" bgcolor=#E9E9E9
| 0 ||  || MBA-M || 17.0 || 2.2 km || multiple || 2004–2020 || 21 Apr 2020 || 41 || align=left | Disc.: Spacewatch || 
|- id="2004 SL63" bgcolor=#E9E9E9
| 0 ||  || MBA-M || 17.6 || 1.7 km || multiple || 1995–2018 || 06 Nov 2018 || 44 || align=left | Disc.: Spacewatch || 
|- id="2004 SM63" bgcolor=#E9E9E9
| 0 ||  || MBA-M || 17.63 || data-sort-value="0.89" | 890 m || multiple || 2004–2022 || 24 Jan 2022 || 62 || align=left | Disc.: Spacewatch || 
|- id="2004 SN63" bgcolor=#d6d6d6
| 0 ||  || MBA-O || 16.3 || 3.1 km || multiple || 1996–2021 || 14 Jun 2021 || 108 || align=left | Disc.: Spacewatch || 
|- id="2004 SP63" bgcolor=#fefefe
| 0 ||  || MBA-I || 18.85 || data-sort-value="0.50" | 500 m || multiple || 2004–2021 || 09 Nov 2021 || 64 || align=left | Disc.: LPL/Spacewatch II || 
|- id="2004 SQ63" bgcolor=#fefefe
| 0 ||  || MBA-I || 18.87 || data-sort-value="0.50" | 500 m || multiple || 1997–2021 || 05 Jul 2021 || 59 || align=left | Disc.: Spacewatch || 
|- id="2004 SR63" bgcolor=#E9E9E9
| 0 ||  || MBA-M || 18.20 || data-sort-value="0.96" | 960 m || multiple || 2004–2021 || 08 Aug 2021 || 63 || align=left | Disc.: Spacewatch || 
|- id="2004 SS63" bgcolor=#E9E9E9
| 3 ||  || MBA-M || 18.0 || 1.1 km || multiple || 2004–2017 || 16 Oct 2017 || 37 || align=left | Disc.: Spacewatch || 
|- id="2004 ST63" bgcolor=#fefefe
| 0 ||  || MBA-I || 18.4 || data-sort-value="0.62" | 620 m || multiple || 2004–2021 || 10 Jan 2021 || 99 || align=left | Disc.: Spacewatch || 
|- id="2004 SU63" bgcolor=#d6d6d6
| 0 ||  || MBA-O || 16.73 || 2.5 km || multiple || 2004–2021 || 26 Nov 2021 || 92 || align=left | Disc.: Spacewatch || 
|- id="2004 SV63" bgcolor=#E9E9E9
| 0 ||  || MBA-M || 18.19 || data-sort-value="0.97" | 970 m || multiple || 2004–2021 || 27 Sep 2021 || 76 || align=left | Disc.: Spacewatch || 
|- id="2004 SW63" bgcolor=#E9E9E9
| 0 ||  || MBA-M || 17.0 || 1.7 km || multiple || 2004–2019 || 24 Jan 2019 || 48 || align=left | Disc.: SpacewatchAlt.: 2010 CG17 || 
|- id="2004 SX63" bgcolor=#E9E9E9
| 0 ||  || MBA-M || 17.6 || 1.3 km || multiple || 2004–2020 || 22 Apr 2020 || 36 || align=left | Disc.: Spacewatch || 
|- id="2004 SY63" bgcolor=#E9E9E9
| 0 ||  || MBA-M || 18.11 || 1.0 km || multiple || 2004–2021 || 06 Nov 2021 || 92 || align=left | Disc.: Spacewatch || 
|- id="2004 SA64" bgcolor=#fefefe
| 0 ||  || MBA-I || 19.0 || data-sort-value="0.47" | 470 m || multiple || 2004–2020 || 21 Jun 2020 || 38 || align=left | Disc.: Spacewatch || 
|- id="2004 SB64" bgcolor=#fefefe
| 2 ||  || MBA-I || 19.0 || data-sort-value="0.47" | 470 m || multiple || 2004–2018 || 16 Jun 2018 || 24 || align=left | Disc.: LPL/Spacewatch II || 
|- id="2004 SC64" bgcolor=#fefefe
| 0 ||  || MBA-I || 18.6 || data-sort-value="0.57" | 570 m || multiple || 2004–2020 || 15 Oct 2020 || 79 || align=left | Disc.: Spacewatch || 
|- id="2004 SE64" bgcolor=#fefefe
| 0 ||  || MBA-I || 18.5 || data-sort-value="0.59" | 590 m || multiple || 2004–2019 || 04 Dec 2019 || 52 || align=left | Disc.: Spacewatch || 
|- id="2004 SF64" bgcolor=#E9E9E9
| 0 ||  || MBA-M || 17.5 || 1.8 km || multiple || 2004–2019 || 02 Jan 2019 || 50 || align=left | Disc.: Spacewatch || 
|- id="2004 SG64" bgcolor=#E9E9E9
| 0 ||  || MBA-M || 17.78 || 1.2 km || multiple || 2003–2021 || 30 Oct 2021 || 86 || align=left | Disc.: Spacewatch || 
|- id="2004 SJ64" bgcolor=#E9E9E9
| 0 ||  || MBA-M || 17.84 || 1.1 km || multiple || 2004–2021 || 09 Nov 2021 || 101 || align=left | Disc.: Spacewatch || 
|- id="2004 SL64" bgcolor=#fefefe
| 3 ||  || MBA-I || 18.7 || data-sort-value="0.54" | 540 m || multiple || 2004–2020 || 22 Jan 2020 || 37 || align=left | Disc.: Spacewatch || 
|- id="2004 SM64" bgcolor=#fefefe
| 1 ||  || MBA-I || 18.3 || data-sort-value="0.65" | 650 m || multiple || 2004–2020 || 22 Jan 2020 || 45 || align=left | Disc.: LPL/Spacewatch II || 
|- id="2004 SN64" bgcolor=#E9E9E9
| 0 ||  || MBA-M || 18.32 || data-sort-value="0.91" | 910 m || multiple || 2004–2021 || 07 Nov 2021 || 76 || align=left | Disc.: LPL/Spacewatch II || 
|- id="2004 SO64" bgcolor=#E9E9E9
| 0 ||  || MBA-M || 17.74 || 1.2 km || multiple || 2004–2021 || 17 Jun 2021 || 30 || align=left | Disc.: SSS || 
|- id="2004 SP64" bgcolor=#fefefe
| 1 ||  || MBA-I || 19.0 || data-sort-value="0.47" | 470 m || multiple || 2004–2019 || 25 Sep 2019 || 30 || align=left | Disc.: Spacewatch || 
|- id="2004 SR64" bgcolor=#E9E9E9
| 0 ||  || MBA-M || 18.60 || data-sort-value="0.80" | 800 m || multiple || 2004–2021 || 03 Oct 2021 || 46 || align=left | Disc.: Spacewatch || 
|- id="2004 SS64" bgcolor=#fefefe
| 0 ||  || MBA-I || 18.0 || data-sort-value="0.75" | 750 m || multiple || 2004–2019 || 25 Sep 2019 || 76 || align=left | Disc.: Spacewatch || 
|- id="2004 ST64" bgcolor=#d6d6d6
| 0 ||  || MBA-O || 17.0 || 2.2 km || multiple || 2004–2020 || 16 Sep 2020 || 77 || align=left | Disc.: Spacewatch || 
|- id="2004 SV64" bgcolor=#fefefe
| 0 ||  || MBA-I || 18.28 || data-sort-value="0.66" | 660 m || multiple || 2004–2021 || 09 Sep 2021 || 118 || align=left | Disc.: Spacewatch || 
|- id="2004 SX64" bgcolor=#fefefe
| 0 ||  || MBA-I || 18.55 || data-sort-value="0.58" | 580 m || multiple || 2004–2021 || 07 Feb 2021 || 39 || align=left | Disc.: LPL/Spacewatch II || 
|- id="2004 SY64" bgcolor=#d6d6d6
| 0 ||  || MBA-O || 17.2 || 2.0 km || multiple || 2004–2020 || 06 Dec 2020 || 164 || align=left | Disc.: LONEOS || 
|- id="2004 SZ64" bgcolor=#d6d6d6
| 0 ||  || MBA-O || 17.5 || 1.8 km || multiple || 2004–2020 || 23 Sep 2020 || 73 || align=left | Disc.: Spacewatch || 
|- id="2004 SA65" bgcolor=#d6d6d6
| 0 ||  || MBA-O || 16.37 || 3.0 km || multiple || 2004–2021 || 30 Jul 2021 || 107 || align=left | Disc.: SpacewatchAlt.: 2010 MH134 || 
|- id="2004 SB65" bgcolor=#fefefe
| 0 ||  || MBA-I || 18.9 || data-sort-value="0.49" | 490 m || multiple || 2004–2019 || 19 Dec 2019 || 61 || align=left | Disc.: Spacewatch || 
|- id="2004 SD65" bgcolor=#d6d6d6
| 0 ||  || MBA-O || 17.08 || 2.1 km || multiple || 2004–2021 || 28 Nov 2021 || 64 || align=left | Disc.: Spacewatch || 
|- id="2004 SE65" bgcolor=#E9E9E9
| 0 ||  || MBA-M || 17.4 || 1.8 km || multiple || 2004–2020 || 20 Jan 2020 || 40 || align=left | Disc.: LPL/Spacewatch II || 
|- id="2004 SG65" bgcolor=#E9E9E9
| 0 ||  || MBA-M || 17.7 || 1.6 km || multiple || 2004–2020 || 01 Feb 2020 || 66 || align=left | Disc.: Spacewatch || 
|- id="2004 SH65" bgcolor=#fefefe
| 0 ||  || MBA-I || 18.1 || data-sort-value="0.71" | 710 m || multiple || 2004–2020 || 09 Dec 2020 || 65 || align=left | Disc.: LPL/Spacewatch II || 
|- id="2004 SK65" bgcolor=#E9E9E9
| 0 ||  || MBA-M || 17.6 || 1.3 km || multiple || 2004–2020 || 20 Apr 2020 || 49 || align=left | Disc.: Spacewatch || 
|- id="2004 SL65" bgcolor=#fefefe
| 0 ||  || MBA-I || 18.4 || data-sort-value="0.62" | 620 m || multiple || 2004–2021 || 12 Jun 2021 || 58 || align=left | Disc.: Spacewatch || 
|- id="2004 SM65" bgcolor=#fefefe
| 0 ||  || MBA-I || 18.56 || data-sort-value="0.58" | 580 m || multiple || 2004–2021 || 08 May 2021 || 41 || align=left | Disc.: LPL/Spacewatch II || 
|- id="2004 SO65" bgcolor=#d6d6d6
| 0 ||  || MBA-O || 16.90 || 2.3 km || multiple || 2004–2021 || 09 May 2021 || 52 || align=left | Disc.: LPL/Spacewatch II || 
|- id="2004 SP65" bgcolor=#fefefe
| 0 ||  || MBA-I || 18.70 || data-sort-value="0.54" | 540 m || multiple || 2004–2021 || 27 Oct 2021 || 68 || align=left | Disc.: Spacewatch || 
|- id="2004 SQ65" bgcolor=#d6d6d6
| 0 ||  || MBA-O || 17.57 || 1.7 km || multiple || 2004–2020 || 24 Oct 2020 || 46 || align=left | Disc.: Spacewatch || 
|- id="2004 SR65" bgcolor=#d6d6d6
| 0 ||  || MBA-O || 17.18 || 2.0 km || multiple || 2004–2021 || 26 Oct 2021 || 39 || align=left | Disc.: SpacewatchAdded on 22 July 2020 || 
|- id="2004 SS65" bgcolor=#FA8072
| 1 ||  || MCA || 18.3 || data-sort-value="0.65" | 650 m || multiple || 2004–2020 || 21 Dec 2020 || 124 || align=left | Disc.: LONEOSAdded on 22 July 2020 || 
|- id="2004 ST65" bgcolor=#fefefe
| 2 ||  || MBA-I || 18.9 || data-sort-value="0.49" | 490 m || multiple || 2004–2021 || 08 Jun 2021 || 49 || align=left | Disc.: SpacewatchAdded on 22 July 2020 || 
|- id="2004 SV65" bgcolor=#d6d6d6
| 0 ||  || MBA-O || 16.6 || 2.7 km || multiple || 2004–2021 || 06 Oct 2021 || 82 || align=left | Disc.: Mauna Kea Obs.Added on 19 October 2020Alt.: 2010 PM30 || 
|- id="2004 SW65" bgcolor=#d6d6d6
| 0 ||  || MBA-O || 16.93 || 2.3 km || multiple || 2002–2022 || 23 Jan 2022 || 67 || align=left | Disc.: SpacewatchAdded on 19 October 2020 || 
|- id="2004 SX65" bgcolor=#fefefe
| 2 ||  || MBA-I || 18.8 || data-sort-value="0.52" | 520 m || multiple || 2004–2019 || 26 Sep 2019 || 21 || align=left | Disc.: SpacewatchAdded on 17 January 2021 || 
|- id="2004 SY65" bgcolor=#d6d6d6
| 0 ||  || MBA-O || 17.1 || 2.1 km || multiple || 2004–2020 || 20 Dec 2020 || 51 || align=left | Disc.: SpacewatchAdded on 17 January 2021Alt.: 2017 DW94 || 
|- id="2004 SA66" bgcolor=#E9E9E9
| 0 ||  || MBA-M || 17.52 || 1.3 km || multiple || 2003–2021 || 04 Aug 2021 || 123 || align=left | Disc.: LPL/Spacewatch IIAdded on 11 May 2021 || 
|- id="2004 SB66" bgcolor=#E9E9E9
| 0 ||  || MBA-M || 17.8 || data-sort-value="0.82" | 820 m || multiple || 2003–2020 || 18 Aug 2020 || 33 || align=left | Disc.: LPL/Spacewatch IIAdded on 17 June 2021 || 
|- id="2004 SC66" bgcolor=#fefefe
| 0 ||  || MBA-I || 17.9 || data-sort-value="0.78" | 780 m || multiple || 2004–2021 || 02 Jun 2021 || 65 || align=left | Disc.: SpacewatchAdded on 21 August 2021Alt.: 2015 VE84 || 
|- id="2004 SD66" bgcolor=#d6d6d6
| 0 ||  || MBA-O || 17.21 || 2.0 km || multiple || 2004–2021 || 26 Nov 2021 || 63 || align=left | Disc.: SpacewatchAdded on 21 August 2021 || 
|- id="2004 SE66" bgcolor=#E9E9E9
| 2 ||  || MBA-M || 18.62 || data-sort-value="0.56" | 560 m || multiple || 2004–2016 || 08 Aug 2016 || 32 || align=left | Disc.: LPL/Spacewatch IIAdded on 21 August 2021 || 
|- id="2004 SF66" bgcolor=#fefefe
| 0 ||  || MBA-I || 19.1 || data-sort-value="0.45" | 450 m || multiple || 2004–2019 || 05 Nov 2019 || 30 || align=left | Disc.: SpacewatchAdded on 21 August 2021 || 
|- id="2004 SG66" bgcolor=#fefefe
| 0 ||  || MBA-I || 18.98 || data-sort-value="0.48" | 480 m || multiple || 2004–2021 || 08 Sep 2021 || 46 || align=left | Disc.: SpacewatchAdded on 21 August 2021 || 
|- id="2004 SJ66" bgcolor=#E9E9E9
| 0 ||  || MBA-M || 18.15 || data-sort-value="0.99" | 990 m || multiple || 2004–2021 || 06 Nov 2021 || 48 || align=left | Disc.: SpacewatchAdded on 30 September 2021 || 
|- id="2004 SK66" bgcolor=#fefefe
| 0 ||  || MBA-I || 19.07 || data-sort-value="0.46" | 460 m || multiple || 2004–2021 || 08 Dec 2021 || 55 || align=left | Disc.: LPL/Spacewatch IIAdded on 5 November 2021 || 
|- id="2004 SL66" bgcolor=#fefefe
| 0 ||  || MBA-I || 18.80 || data-sort-value="0.52" | 520 m || multiple || 2004–2015 || 07 Nov 2015 || 25 || align=left | Disc.: SpacewatchAdded on 5 November 2021 || 
|- id="2004 SM66" bgcolor=#d6d6d6
| 1 ||  || MBA-O || 17.50 || 1.8 km || multiple || 2004–2021 || 07 Nov 2021 || 42 || align=left | Disc.: SpacewatchAdded on 5 November 2021 || 
|- id="2004 SN66" bgcolor=#d6d6d6
| 2 ||  || MBA-O || 18.15 || 1.3 km || multiple || 2004–2021 || 06 Nov 2021 || 25 || align=left | Disc.: LPL/Spacewatch IIAdded on 5 November 2021 || 
|}
back to top

References 
 

Lists of unnumbered minor planets